Knizhovnik is a village in the municipality of Haskovo, in Haskovo Province, in southern Bulgaria.

This village is the birthplace of the famous Bulgarian football player from the 1960s, (Petar Zhekov)

References

Villages in Haskovo Province